Yalgoo may refer to:

Yalgoo, Western Australia, a locality in Western Australia
Yalgoo bioregion, an ecological region of Western Australia
Shire of Yalgoo, a local government area
Electoral district of Yalgoo, a former electorate of the Western Australian Legislative Assembly
Acacia longiphyllodinea, a wattle native to Western Australia